Memari College, established in 1981, is the general degree college in Memari, Purba Bardhaman district. It offers undergraduate courses in arts, commerce and sciences. It is affiliated to  University of Burdwan.

Departments

Science

Mathematics
Computer Science
Physics
Chemistry
Botany
Nutrition
Economics

Arts and Commerce

Journalism and Mass Communication
 Geography
English
Bengali
History
Sanskrit
Political Science
Education
Philosophy
Economics
Commerce
Music

Accreditation
Recently, Memari College has been re-accredited and awarded B grade by the National Assessment and Accreditation Council (NAAC). The college is also recognized by the University Grants Commission (UGC).

See also

References

External links
 Memari College

Colleges affiliated to University of Burdwan
Educational institutions established in 1981
Universities and colleges in Purba Bardhaman district
1981 establishments in West Bengal